Alice Doyard is an Oscar winning French film maker. Her area of specialism is history and the effects of international conflict. She was made a Chevalier de l'Ordre des Arts et des Lettres by the French government in 2021.  In the same year she was named as one of the 50 Most influential French people by Vanity Fair magazine. Doyard was born in Grenoble in 1972, one of four children of Jean Doyard, an engineer, and his wife Catherine, a freelance journalist. She moved to Paris in her early teens.

Education
Alice Doyard was educated at the Lycée Carnot in the 17th arrondissement of Paris. After obtaining her baccalaureate she studied at Paris Dauphine University where she obtained Bachelor's and Master's degrees in Mathematics. She also studied media and cinema at De Paul University in Chicago.

Work
In 2021 Doyard won an Oscar for her work as creative producer on the film 'Colette' which follows the journey of a young historian from the north of France, Lucie Fouble, and Colette Marin-Catherine, a 92-year-old former Resistance member, who together retrace the journey of Colette's brother Jean-Pierre, who was deported to Nazi Germany at the age of 19. The film was distributed by Guardian Films of the United Kingdom and also won Best Documentary Short at the Big Sky Festival in Montana and the Young Cineastes Award at the Palm Springs International Film Festival.
Doyard has worked as a producer for BBC News in the eastern Congo and the Central African Republic and was a member of the BBC team which won a Golden Nymph at the Monte Carlo Television Festival in 2018 for covering the fall of Robert Mugabe in Zimbabwe. She has also worked extensively for the BBC on terrorism and the European migrant crisis.
Her other credits include: Remembering Nuremberg, 75 years On (BBC), The Confined: A Story of Hidden Children (BBC), The Remarkable Resistance of Lilo (BBC), Resistance Women : The Fight Against Hitler in Berlin (BBC), World War One from Above (BBC), Teenage Tommies (BBC), Terres de Cinéma : Bridget Jones et London (Arte), Les Apprentis Sorciers du Climat/Clockwork Climate (Arte), Immortalité/Waiting for Immortality (Arte), Enfants Forçats/ Child Slave Labourers (Arte). 
Before becoming a film maker Doyard worked in banking as a risk analyst and later as a statistician at the European Central Bank in Frankfurt. She became a film maker in 2006, beginning as a researcher and assistant producer on documentary projects with the BBC, ARTE, ITV and others.

Personal life
She is the mother of three daughters and lives between Paris and London.

References

External links 
 

French film producers
Year of birth missing (living people)
Living people